Rhampholeon beraduccii, also known commonly as Beraducci's pygmy chameleon or the Mahenge pygmy chameleon, is a species of lizard in the family Chamaeleonidae. The species is endemic to Tanzania.

Etymology
The specific name, beraduccii, is in honor of Italian herpetologist Joe Beraducci.

Geographic range
R. beraducii is found in the Mahenge Mountains of Tanzania.

Habitat

Description
R. beraduccii is brown and very small. The maximum recorded snout-to-vent length (SVL) is only . The tail is very short, about one fourth SVL.

Reproduction
R. beraduccii is oviparous.

References

Further reading
Mariaux J, Tilbury CR (2006). "The pygmy chameleons of the Eastern Arc Range (Tanzania): evolutionary relationships and the description of three new species of Rhampholeon (Sauria: Chamaeleonidae)". Herpetological Journal 16 (3): 315–331. (Rhampholeon beraduccii, new species).
Spawls S, Howell K, Hinkel H, Menegon M (2018). Field Guide to East African Reptiles, Second Edition. London: Bloomsbury Natural History. 624 pp. . (Rhampholeon beraduccii, p. 250).
Tilbury C (2010). Chameleons of Africa. Frankfurt am Main, Germany: Edition Chimaira. 831 pp. . (Rhampholeon beraduccii, p. 167).

Rhampholeon
Reptiles described in 2006
Taxa named by Colin R. Tilbury
Reptiles of Tanzania